Ron Meyers (born November 22, 1950) is an American lawyer and politician in the state of Washington. He served in the Washington House of Representatives from 1987 to 1995 as a Democrat. Born in Tacoma, he attended Central Washington University and the University of Puget Sound School of Law and is a lawyer.

References

1950 births
Living people
Democratic Party members of the Washington House of Representatives